Filippos Ioannou Pantos (Zagora, 1796 – 1880) was a Greek 19th century benefactor professor of the University of Athens.

Sources

References 

Rectors of the National and Kapodistrian University of Athens
Members of the Greek Senate
Academic staff of the National and Kapodistrian University of Athens
Greek philologists
Commons category link is on Wikidata
1796 births
1880 deaths
People from Zagora, Greece